Selwyn County was one of the counties of New Zealand on the South Island.

References 
 http://christchurchcitylibraries.com/Heritage/Chronology/Year/1910.asp

See also 
 List of former territorial authorities in New Zealand

Counties of New Zealand
Politics of Canterbury, New Zealand